Cococinel was a French-Belgian children's television programme. Directed by Raymond Burlet and written by Yolande Baillet and Jean Montagné, 52 episodes of the animated cartoon were made in 1992. The main character is a ladybird who, aided by her friends, teaches about ecology and the environment.

VHS releases
 In the UK, the English version was released on two VHS cassettes with each of them containing eleven episodes.

References

External links
Link to theme music and lyrics.
Theme video on Dailymotion.

Australian Broadcasting Corporation original programming
Belgian children's animated adventure television series
Belgian children's animated comedy television series
Belgian children's animated fantasy television series
French children's animated adventure television series
French children's animated comedy television series
French children's animated fantasy television series
1990s French animated television series
1992 French television series debuts
1992 French television series endings
French-language television programming in Belgium
1992 Belgian television series debuts
1992 Belgian television series endings
Fictional beetles
Television series about insects
Television series about spiders